Živa Klemenčič (born 7 January 2001 in Kranj) is a Slovenian biathlete. She competed at the  2022 Winter Olympics, in Women's individual Biathlon, and Women's sprint.

She competed at the 2021–22 Biathlon World Cup.

References

External links 
 Ziva Klemencic from Slovenia during Biathlon at the Beijing 2022 Winter Olympic Games  Photo by Ulrik Pedersen/NurPhoto
 

2001 births
Slovenian female biathletes
Living people
Biathletes at the 2022 Winter Olympics
Olympic biathletes of Slovenia
Sportspeople from Kranj